Bogorodsk is a town and the administrative center of Bogorodsky District in Nizhny Novgorod Oblast, Russia, located  southwest of Nizhny Novgorod, the administrative center of the oblast. Population:

History
It has been known since 1570 as the village of Bogorodichnoye, Bogoroditskoye, or Bogorodskoye. It was granted town status in 1923.

Administrative and municipal status
Within the framework of administrative divisions, Bogorodsk serves as the administrative center of Bogorodsky District. As an administrative division, it is incorporated within Bogorodsky District as the town of district significance of Bogorodsk. As a municipal division, the town of district significance of Bogorodsk is incorporated within Bogorodsky Municipal District as Bogorodsk Urban Settlement.

Economy
Bogorodsk is one of the oldest centers of the leather industry in Russia.

The NRING Circuit is located in Bogorodsk, and is used for Russian national motor racing events.

References

Notes

Sources

External links
Official website of Bogorodsk 
Bogorodsk Business Directory 

Cities and towns in Nizhny Novgorod Oblast